The Vice Rags are an American rock band from New Jersey.

History
The Vice Rags were formed in 2017 by born-and-raised New Jersey musicians, Paul Rosevear and Joe Chyb, from North Brunswick, New Jersey, and Jack Roberts and Gay Elvis from Hillsborough, New Jersey. They met while performing in prior bands in the New Jersey independent rock scene, and together they play a blend of "tribute to the '50s and '60s sounds that influenced the '70s and '80s," and are classified as bluesy, garage rock and fuzz rock. 

They released a self-titled EP in November 2017, which was produced by Paul Ritchie and recorded at Insidious Sound Studio in Neptune. Music Editor Jim Testa of Jersey Beat called The Vice Rags his favorite EP of 2017.

Mint 400 Records
In 2018, the Vice Rags signed with independent label Mint 400 Records. They released the seven-track EP Hope the Neighbors are Lookin on 27 July 2018. The EP is a re-release of their self-titled EP, with a rendition of Little Richard's "Lucille" as a bonus track. In a 2018 interview with Spill, Rosevear explains their cover was "one of the first songs we jammed on at our first ever practice; we were so happy with how we changed the cover that we kept it that way and put it on the album." The album was listed in New Jersey Stages Best NJ Indie Records of 2018, and Joe Chyb received the Asbury Park Music Awards' Top Drummer award.

Members
Joe Chyb – drums
Gay Elvis – bass and vocals
Jack Roberts – lead guitar
Paul Rosevear – vocals and guitar

Discography

EPs
The Vice Rags (2017)
Hope the Neighbors are Lookin (2018)
Midnight Ride (2022)

Appearing on
NJ / NY Mixtape (2018)

References

Citations

Bibliography

Mint 400 Records artists
Musical groups established in 2017
Rock music groups from New Jersey
2017 establishments in New Jersey